115-121 Kent Street, Millers Point are heritage-listed terrace houses located at 115-121 Kent Street, in the inner city Sydney suburb of Millers Point in the City of Sydney local government area of New South Wales, Australia. The property was added to the New South Wales State Heritage Register on 2 April 1999.

History 
Millers Point is one of the earliest areas of European settlement in Australia, and a focus for maritime activities. First tenanted by the NSW Department of Housing in 1983.

Description 
One of a group of two storey Victorian Italianate terraces in good condition. Of particular note is the elaborate parapet with many classical details concealing dormer windows to the attics and the fine cast iron balustrades and columns to the verandahs on both levels. This terrace contains four one-bedroom units. Storeys: Two; Construction: Painted rendered masonry walls, slate roof to main body of house corrugated galvanised iron to balcony roof and rear wing. Decorative iron lace. Painted timber joinery. Style: Victorian Italianate.

The external condition of the property is good.

Heritage listing 
As at 23 November 2000, one of a group of well detailed Victorian Italianate terrace houses. Elaborately modelled facade. Important streetscape element.

It is part of the Millers Point Conservation Area, an intact residential and maritime precinct. It contains residential buildings and civic spaces dating from the 1830s and is an important example of 19th century adaptation of the landscape.

Terrace was listed on the New South Wales State Heritage Register on 2 April 1999.

See also 

Australian residential architectural styles

References

Bibliography

Attribution

External links

 

New South Wales State Heritage Register sites located in Millers Point
Italianate architecture in Sydney
Terraced houses in Sydney
Articles incorporating text from the New South Wales State Heritage Register
Millers Point Conservation Area